Kruševo is an uninhabited settlement in Croatia.

References

Ghost towns in Croatia